Mehmet Kenan Dalbaşar (1886; Istanbul - March 23, 1935; Istanbul), also known as Kenan Bey, was an officer of the Ottoman Army and the general of the Turkish Army.

See also
List of high-ranking commanders of the Turkish War of Independence

Sources

1886 births
1935 deaths
Military personnel from Istanbul
Ottoman Military Academy alumni
Ottoman Military College alumni
Ottoman Army officers
Ottoman military personnel of the Balkan Wars
Ottoman military personnel of World War I
Turkish military personnel of the Franco-Turkish War
Recipients of the Medal of Independence with Red Ribbon (Turkey)
Turkish Army generals
Deputy Chiefs of the Turkish General Staff
Burials at Turkish State Cemetery